Ganges was the second Nourse Line ship to be named Ganges. The first  was built in 1861 and wrecked in 1881. Ganges was a 1,529-ton iron barque, built by Osbourne, Graham & Company of Sunderland and launched on 25 March 1882.

Ganges made three trips to Fiji, the first on 27 June 1885 carrying 523 Indian indentured labourers. She arrived next on 3 September 1899, carrying 464 Indian indentured labourers and finally on 21 June 1900, carrying 554 passengers. She also made voyages to the West Indies, arriving in Trinidad on 25 November 1890 carrying 568 passengers and arriving in Suriname on 23 April 1889.

She was sold to Norwegian owners in 1904 and renamed Asters. All on board Asters survived.

See also 

Indian Indenture Ships to Fiji
Indian indenture system

References

Notes

Bibliography

External links 
 Genealogy.com
 Nourse Line

1882 ships
Ships built on the River Wear
Indian indentureship in Trinidad and Tobago
History of Suriname
Indian indenture ships to Fiji
Individual sailing vessels
Victorian-era passenger ships of the United Kingdom
World War I merchant ships of Norway
Maritime incidents in 1917
Ships sunk by German submarines in World War I
World War I shipwrecks in the Atlantic Ocean